Heistad is a village in Telemark, Norway.

Villages in Vestfold og Telemark